Darryl Gerlach (born 25 January 1944) is a former Australian rules footballer who played for Essendon in the VFL.

Gerlach played his football in the back pocket for Essendon although he started his career in the centre. He was a premiership player with Essendon in 1965 and won their best and fairest award in 1970. He also represented Victoria at interstate football during the late 1960s.

External links

1944 births
Australian rules footballers from Victoria (Australia)
Essendon Football Club players
Essendon Football Club Premiership players
Crichton Medal winners
Strathmore Football Club players
Living people
One-time VFL/AFL Premiership players